Vora Samni is a village located in Vagra Taluka of Bharuch District, Gujarat, India.

Villages in Bharuch district